Accra SkyTrain is a planned fully automated, elevated light railway metro network for Accra, Greater Accra, Ghana. The proposed network will have five routes, four of which are radial routes that originate at a new terminal at the Kwame Nkrumah Interchange, and another route that loops around the city.

The announced system will use the Aeromovel technology and will have capacity to carry 10,000 passengers per hour per direction on each route.

In 2018 the Government of Ghana signed a MOU with AiSky Train Consortium of South Africa.   Following completion of a feasibility study, in November 2019 the parties signed a build–operate–transfer concession agreement.  The company will develop the system at an estimated cost of $2.6 billion.  The government has said the project is a "100% private sector owned project" and is not government funded.

No work has commenced and the project has been delayed due to legal questions and the coronavirus pandemic.  In February 2021 the government announced it was intending to proceed but was waiting for reports from the Attorney General before submitting legislation to the parliament.

2010 monorail proposal 
Accra Monorail was a 2010 proposal for a monorail line with 16 stations for Accra. The project did not proceed passed the planning stage.

External References
 AiSkyTrain Consortium homepage

References

Rail transport in Ghana
Railway lines in Ghana
Proposed transport infrastructure in Ghana